There are 187,888 lakes in Finland larger than 5 ares (500 square metres / 5,382 sq.ft.) Most are small, but there are 309 lakes or reservoirs larger than 10 km². They are listed here along with some smaller noteworthy lakes.

Alphabetical listing

A
Aapajärvi, Ala-Kintaus, Ala-Kitka

B
Bodominjärvi

E
Elämäjärvi, Enäjärvi, Enijärvi, Enonvesi, Evijärvi

H
Haapajärvi, Hankavesi, Hankavesi – Lonkari, Hankavesi-Välivesi, Hauhonselkä, Haukivesi, Hiidenvesi, Hiirenvesi, Hirvijärvi Reservoir, Hirvijärvi – Kalliovesi, Höytiäinen, Hyrynjärvi

I
Iijärvi (1), Iijärvi (2), Iijärvi (3), Iijärvi (4), Iisvesi, Iivantiira – Juttuajärvi, Ilmoilanselkä, Immalanjärvi, Inari, Irnijärvi – Ala-Irni, Iso and Pieni Tipasjärvi, Iso Lamujärvi, Iso Lohijärvi, Iso- and Keski-Kero, Iso-Kiimanen, Iso-Naakkima, Iso-Pyhäntä, Iso-Roine, Iso-Vietonen, Isojärvi (1), Isojärvi (2)

J
Jääsjärvi, Jäsys – Retujärvi, Jerisjärvi, Jonkeri, Jonku, Jormasjärvi, Joukamojärvi, Joutjärvi, Joutsijärvi, Joutsjärvi, Juojärvi, Juolasvesi – Sarkavesi, Juurusvesi–Akonvesi, Jyväsjärvi

K
Kaavinjärvi, Kalajärvi Reservoir, Kallavesi (1), Kallavesi (2), Kangasjärvi, Kangasvesi, Kankareenjärvi, Kankarisvesi, Kannonselkä, Karankajärvi, Karhijärvi, Karijärvi, Karikkoselkä, Kaukajärvi, Kaukuanjärvi, Keitele, Kellojärvi – Korpijärvi, Kelontekemäjärvi, Kemijärvi, Kermajärvi, Keurusselkä, Keyritty, Kiantajärvi (1), Kiantajärvi (2), Kiesimä, Kiitämä, Kilpisjärvi – Alajärvi, Kiteenjärvi, Kiuruvesi, Kivesjärvi, Kivijärvi (1), Kivijärvi (2), Koitere, Koivujärvi, Kolima, Koljonselkä, Kolkonjärvi, Konnevesi, Konnivesi, Korpijärvi, Korpijärvi – Verijärvi, Korvuanjärvi, Koskelovesi – Miekkavesi, Kostonjärvi, Köyliönjärvi, Kukkia, Kulovesi, Kuohattijärvi, Kuohijärvi, Kuolimo, Kuorasjärvi, Kuorevesi, Kuorinka, Kuortaneenjärvi, Kurkijärvi – Tuuliainen, Kuttajärvi, Kuuhankavesi, Kuusamojärvi, Kuusvesi, Kuvansi, Kynsijärvi – Kynsilampi, Kynsivesi – Leivonvesi, Kyrösjärvi, Kyyjärvi, Kyyvesi

L
Laakajärvi, Lahnavesi, Lammasjärvi, Lampaanjärvi, Längelmävesi, Lannevesi, Lapinjärvi, Lappajärvi, Lappalanjärvi, Lentiira, Lentua, Leppävesi, Lestijärvi, Liesvesi, Lievestuoreenjärvi, Livojärvi, Lohjanjärvi, Lokka Reservoir, Loppijärvi, Luirojärvi, Lummene

M
Maaninkajärvi, Maavesi, Mahnalanselkä – Kirkkojärvi, Mallasvesi, Mallos, Melakko – Loitimo, Miekojärvi, Muojärvi – Kirpistö, Mutusjärvi, Muurasjärvi, Muuratjärvi, Muuruejärvi

N
Näläntöjärvi, Nammijärvi, Näsijärvi, Nerkoonjärvi (1), Nerkoonjärvi (2), Niemisvesi – Pemu, Niinivesi, Nilakka, Niskajärvi, Nitsijärvi, Nolimojärvi,{
  "type": "FeatureCollection",
  "features": [
    {
      "type": "Feature",
      "properties": {},
      "geometry": {
        "type": "Point",
        "coordinates": [
          28.104314804077152,
          66.40187455881
        ]
      }
    }
  ]
} Norvajärvi, Nuorajärvi, Nuoramoisjärvi

O
Oijärvi, Olkkajärvi – Matkalampi, Onkamojärvi, Onkivesi, Ontojärvi – Nurmesjärvi, Orajärvi, Orivesi, Osmankajärvi, Otermanjärvi, Oulujärvi

P
Pääjärvi (1), Pääjärvi (2), Paatari (Paadaar), Päijänne, Paljavesi, Pälkänevesi, Pallasjärvi – Pallaslompolo, Palovesi – Jäminginselkä, Pankajärvi, Pautujärvi, Peruvesi, Pesiöjärvi, Petruma, Pieksänjärvi, Pielavesi, Pielinen, Pieni-Kiimanen, Pieni-Onkamo, Pihlajavesi (Saimaa), Pihlajavesi (Keuruu), Piispajärvi, Pirttijärvi – Kaitainjärvi, Pirttilampi, Pohjois- and Etelä-Virmas, Porovesi, Porttipahta Reservoir, Posionjärvi, Pöyrisjärvi, Pöyrysjärvi Puhosjärvi, Pulmankijärvi, Puruvesi, Puula, Pyhäjärvi (1), Pyhäjärvi (2), Pyhäjärvi (3), Pyhäjärvi (4), Pyhäjärvi (5), Pyhäjärvi (6), Pyhäjärvi (7), Pyhäjärvi (8), Pyhäjärvi (9), Pyhäselkä, Pyhävesi, Pyyvesi, Puujärvi

R
Raanujärvi, Rahajärvi (Raahajärvi), Ranuanjärvi, Rapojärvi – Haukkajärvi, Rauhajärvi, Rautavesi (1), Rautavesi (2), Rehja – Nuasjärvi, Repovesi – Luujärvi, Riistavesi, Rikkavesi, Roine, Ruotsalainen, Ruovesi, Rutajärvi (1), Rutajärvi (2), Ruunaanjärvi, Ryökäsvesi – Liekune

S
Sääksjärvi (1), Sääksjärvi (2), Saanijärvi, Saarijärvi (1), Saarijärvi (2), Saarijärvi (3), Saarijärvi (4), Saimaa, Sälevä, Sapsojärvet, Saraavesi, Särkijärvi, Savivesi, Sevettijärvi, Simojärvi, Simpelejärvi, Sonkari – Riitunlampi, Sorsavesi, Suininki, Summasjärvi, Suolijärvi (1), Suolijärvi (2), Suolisjärvi, Suontee, Suontienselkä – Paasvesi, Surnujärvi, Suuri-Onkamo, Suuri-Pieksä, Suurijärvi, Suvasvesi, Synsiä, Sysmä (1), Sysmä (2), Syvänsi, Syväjärvi 108, Syväri, Syysjärvi

T
Tallusjärvi, Tarjanne, Tohmajärvi, Toisvesi, Torsa – Pieni-Torsa, Tuusjärvi, Tyräjärvi, Tampaja

U
Ukonvesi, Uljua Reservoir, Ullavanjärvi, Unari, Unnukka, Urajärvi, Uurainen

V
Vaalajärvi, Vahvajärvi, Vajukoski basin, Vanajavesi, Vallonjärvi, Vanttausjärvi, Vaskivesi – Visuvesi, Vehkajärvi, Venetjoki Reservoir, Vesijako, Vesijärvi (1), Vesijärvi (2), Viekijärvi, Viiksinselkä, Viinijärvi, Virmajärvi (1), Virmajärvi (2), Vuohijärvi, Vuokalanjärvi, Vuokkijärvi, Vuontisjärvi, Vuosanganjärvi – Hyötyjärvi, Vuosjärvi, Vuotjärvi

Y
Ylä-Enonvesi, Ylä-Rieveli, Yli-Kitka, Yli-Suolijärvi

Ä
Ähtärinjärvi, Äkäsjärvi

Ten largest lakes

(1) Includes Saimaa, Pihlajavesi, Haukivesi, Puruvesi, Orivesi and Pyhäselkä among some smaller lakes.

See also

 Finnish Lakeland

References

Finland
Lakes